is a Japanese footballer who plays as a striker for Rayong F.C. in the Thai League 2.

Sugishita is 1.75m tall and right-footed.

Career

Sporting Goa
Sugishita made his debut for Sporting Clube de Goa on 18 November 2012 during an I-League match against United Sikkim F.C. at the Fatorda Stadium in Goa in which he played till 93rd minute. Sporting Goa won the match 2–1.

Career statistics

Club
Statistics accurate as of December 4, 2022.

References

Living people
1988 births
Japanese footballers
I-League players
Seiya Sugishita
Sporting Clube de Goa players
Seiya Sugishita
Seiya Sugishita
Seiya Sugishita
Seiya Sugishita
Expatriate footballers in Thailand
Association football forwards